Figulus planifrons is a species of beetles in the family Lucanidae. The scientific name of this species was first published 1987 by Bomans.

References

Lucaninae
Beetles described in 1987